Espelette is a commune in the Pyrénées-Atlantiques department in south-western France. It lies in the traditional Basque province of Labourd.

Sights
The town is attractive, with traditional Labourd houses and a castle. The protected sixteenth-century church, Saint-Etienne, has a Baroque altarpiece, and its graveyard has many traditional Basque discoidal tombstones.

Notable people
 Agnès Souret, the first woman ever chosen as Miss France, in 1920, is buried in Espelette. She died in Argentina, aged 26, in 1928, and her body was repatriated to Espelette by her mother, who sold most of her possessions to provide a resting place for her daughter.
 Father Armand David (1826–1900), a Lazarist missionary Catholic priest as well as a zoologist and a botanist, was born in Espelette.

Red peppers
Espelette is known for its dried red peppers, used whole or ground to a hot powder, used in the production of Bayonne ham. The peppers are designated as Appellation d'Origine Contrôlée and are hung to dry outside many of the houses and shops in the village during the summer. The peppers are sold in the town's Wednesday covered market and are honoured in a festival on the last Sunday in October.

See also
Communes of the Pyrénées-Atlantiques department

References

External links

  Ezpeleta in the Bernardo Estornés Lasa — Auñamendi Encyclopedia (Euskomedia Fundazioa)
  Piment d'Espelette, site dedicated to the pepper

Communes of Pyrénées-Atlantiques
Labourd
Pyrénées-Atlantiques communes articles needing translation from French Wikipedia